Alo! is a daily tabloid newspaper published in Belgrade, Serbia.

Launched by Ringier AG (owners of another Serbian daily Blic) on October 15, 2007, Alo! attempts to establish itself on the saturated Serbian daily tabloid market through aggressive campaign that announces it as 'Najveće dnevne novine u Srbiji' ("The biggest daily in Serbia") - referring to its format size. Its editor-in-chief is Ana Ćubela and it is published on 16 pages every day. On October 12, 2009, the daily has changed the format and design, where the newspaper's slogan "Najveće dnevne novine u Srbiji" has dropped, introducing the new billboard campaign "Cela slika na manjem formatu" ("A whole picture on less format").

It also tries to gain market share by initially setting its price at RSD30, which is lower than other established Serbian tabloids such as Blic and Kurir that are sold at RSD45. Alo!s first two issues were distributed for free.

Alo! appeared on the Serbian market around the time many other similar tabloid dailies such as Pravda, Sutra, and Gazeta hit the stands as well, raising questions of their financial viability and political allegiance.

In 2010, when Ringier AG and Axel Springer AG launched a new joint venture Ringier Axel Springer Media AG, Alo! got incorporated among the assets of the newly created company.

See also 
 List of newspapers in Serbia
 Informer (newspaper)

External links
Official website

Newspapers published in Serbia
Publications established in 2007
2007 establishments in Serbia
Mass media in Belgrade